Al Bayane is a daily francophone Moroccan newspaper.

History and profile
Al Bayane was established in 1971. However, another report gives its foundation year as 1972. It is the media outlet of the Party of Progress and Socialism and has a communist political leaning. The publisher of the paper is Bayane SA.

Its sister publication is Bayane Al Yaoume, an Arabic daily. From 1979 to 1985 the editor-in-chief was Fahd Yata.

Its 2001 circulation was 5,000 copies. It was again 5,000 copies in 2003.

References

1971 establishments in Morocco
Bayane
French-language newspapers published in Morocco
Newspapers published in Morocco
Socialist newspapers